Endorioceras is an extinct genus of actively mobile carnivorous cephalopod of the family Baltoceratidae that lived in what would be North America during the Ordovician from 490–479 mya, existing for approximately .

Taxonomy
Endorioceras was named by Flower (1964). It is not extant. Its type is Endorioceras rarum. It was assigned to Baltoceratidae by Flower (1964); and to Ellesmerocerida by Sepkoski (2002).

Morphology
The shell is usually long, and may be straight ("orthoconic") or gently curved.  In life, these animals may have been similar to the modern squid, except for the long shell.

References

 Fossils (Smithsonian Handbooks) by David Ward

Prehistoric cephalopod genera
Ordovician cephalopods
Ordovician cephalopods of North America
Molluscs of North America
Orthocerida